Tomasz Antoni Zamoyski (1707–1752) was a Polish nobleman (szlachcic) who served as the voivode (governor) of Lublin Voivodeship.

Political career

In 1733, he supported the election of Stanisław Leszczyński to the Polish throne. In 1735, after the death of his father, he became the 7th Ordynat of Zamość estate. In 1738, he was elected envoy to the Sejm. In 1744, he was appointed the voivode (governor) of Lublin Voivodeship.

In 1741, he founded the St. John of Nepomuk Church in Zwierzyniec. He was awarded the Knight of the Order of the White Eagle on 3 August 1746.

Personal life
He was married to Marianna Lubienska and Aniela Teresa Michowska. He had one child with Michowska, Klemens Zamoyski.

References

See also
Lublin Voivode

1707 births
1752 deaths
Tomasz Antoni